Peter Ravn (born 16 March 1962) is a former international motorcycle speedway rider from Denmark.

Speedway career 
Ravn won a gold medal as member of the Denmark speedway team at the Speedway World Team Cup in the 1983 Speedway World Team Cup.

He rode in the top tier of British Speedway from 1981-1993, riding for Belle Vue Aces, Cradley Heathens, Wolverhampton Wolves, Coventry Bees and the Arena Essex Hammers. He was also a World Under 21 finalist in 1981 and 1982.

World Final Appearances

Individual World Championship
 1983 -  Norden, Motodrom Halbemond - reserve - did not ride

World Team Cup
 1983 -  Vojens, Speedway Center (with Ole Olsen / Erik Gundersen / Finn Thomsen / Hans Nielsen) - Winner - 37pts (7)

References

1962 births
Living people
Danish speedway riders
Belle Vue Aces riders
Cradley Heathens riders
Wolverhampton Wolves riders
Lakeside Hammers riders
People from Nordfyn Municipality
Sportspeople from the Region of Southern Denmark